The 2014−15 Coppa Titano is the cup's 57th season. It began on 27 August 2013. Libertas are the defending champion.

The winner of the 2014–15 Coppa Titano qualifies for the 2015–16 Europa League first qualifying round.

Group stage
Teams play each other home and away. The top two from each group advance to the Knockout stage. The third placed teams play each other to determine two more teams to join them.

Group A

Group B

Group C

Third place play–off
The three third-place teams will play each other to determine which two teams will advance to the Elimination rounds.

Knockout phase

Quarterfinals
The matches were played on 22 April 2015.

Semifinals
The matches were played on 27 April 2015.

Final
The match was played on 30 April 2015.

References

External links
 official site (Italian)
 uefa.com

Coppa Titano seasons
San Marino
Coppa